Creativity, historically known as The (World) Church of the Creator, is an atheistic ("nontheistic") white supremacist religious movement which espouses white separatism, antitheism, antisemitism, scientific racism, homophobia, and religious and philosophical naturalism. Creativity calls itself a "white racialist" religion and it has been classified as a hate group by the Southern Poverty Law Center and the Anti-Defamation League. It was founded in Lighthouse Point, Florida, United States, by Ben Klassen as the "Church of the Creator" in 1973, and now, it has a presence in several states of the US as well as Australia, Eastern Europe and the UK.

Creativity is promoted by two organizations: the Creativity Alliance (CA also known as the Church of Creativity), and The Creativity Movement. The two groups have common origins, both being created in 2003 after Klassen's successor Matthew F. Hale (who had renamed the organisation New Church of the Creator), was arrested and sentenced to 40 years in prison.

Purportedly, the worldview of Creativity is naturalistic and racialistic, based on its values which are the "survival, expansion and advancement of the White race", according to what the group classifies as the "eternal laws of nature, the experience of history, on logic and common sense". Members of the group believe in a "racial holy war" between "white and non-White races" (including Jews, black people and non-white people of "mixed race").

History
The religion was originally founded as the "Church of the Creator" by Ben Klassen in 1973, when he self-published Nature's Eternal Religion. Adherents of Creativity refer to themselves as Creators, a term derived from Hitler's autobiographical manifesto Mein Kampf, wherein his classification of "races" falls into three categories, with the "white race", deemed the "Master race", termed the "creators". Klassen attempted to recruit neo-Nazis into the church because, apart from disagreements over Nazism's embrace of Positive Christianity, its insistence on nationalism (rather than racialism), anti-Slavic and other sentiments against non-Germanic European ethnic groups, Klassen highly revered Adolf Hitler as a "great pioneer" and Nazism as admirable in many contexts. He developed a rapport with National Alliance leader William Luther Pierce; he met Pierce twice in 1975, and they maintained an "on and off" relationship for the next 18 years. According to Klassen, he "never did understand the logic of what [Pierce] called his Cosmotheism religion ... it has not been of any significance as far as our common goal of promoting White racial solidarity was concerned." In Trials, Tribulations, and Triumphs, Klassen called Pierce "a great man and an outstanding intellectual thinker, and ... one of us."

In 1982, Klassen established a Creativity headquarters in Otto, North Carolina. Although his family expected resistance from local residents, Klassen wrote: "We were not quite prepared for the viciousness of the onslaught by the local paper." Opposition grew, and a May 13, 1982 Franklin Press headline read: "Pro-Hitler, anti-Christ Leader Headquarters Here".

In August 1993, Klassen committed suicide at the age of 75 on the grounds of the Creativity headquarters in Otto by taking an overdose of sleeping pills. His motives were not explained by him at the time but writers studying neo-Nazi groups have suggested that Klassen's reason for taking his own life involved the possible depression caused by the death of his wife, the legal and financial issues  his church endured during the years 1992 and 1993 leading up to his death and the fact he was diagnosed with cancer. Unlike other religions such as Judaism or Christianity, Klassen's Creativity religion does not believe that suicide is a sin and in circumstances such as that faced by its founder Klassen in the early 1990s, is considered a suitable way to die. Klassen was buried on his Creativity headquarters at Otto with his grave in an area that he had already previously designated as "Ben Klassen Memorial Park".

In 1996, Matthew F. Hale, along with other ministers of the original Church of the Creator, formed a successor group known as the "World Church of the Creator". Hale's right to use the name "Church of the Creator" in the United States was lost to the Church of the Creator, an unaffiliated religious organization based in Ashland, Oregon, in a trademark infringement case.

In January 2003, Hale was arrested and charged with attempting to direct security chief Anthony Evola to murder judge Joan Lefkow; he was convicted and sentenced to 40 years' imprisonment. Following the demise of the World Church of the Creator after Hale's arrest in 2003, there formed two distinct groups, known as "The Creativity Movement" and the "Creativity Alliance" or "Church of Creativity". An Australian man, Cailen Cambeul, co-founded Creativity Alliance.

Beliefs and membership
White separatism is fundamental to Creativity, and as such, adherents of it are taught to hate non-whites and avoid social interactions with them. Adherents of the religion are also expected to refute homosexuality, miscegenation, complaining and superstition. Membership in the Creativity Movement is restricted to persons whose genetic heritage is "wholly or predominantly" from Europe, or members of the white race, regardless of where they reside.

The leader of the entire Creativity religion is called the "Pontifex Maximus", Latin for "Greatest Priest" and a title derived from its usage from Ancient Rome. The first Pontifex Maximus in the Creativity religion was Klassen himself.

Creativity has "Sixteen Commandments" and "Five Fundamental Beliefs", which adherents are supposed to recite five times a day, including the belief that "their race is their religion", their belief that the white race is "nature's finest creation", their belief that racial loyalty is the "greatest honor" and their belief that racial treason is the "worst crime", their belief that anything which is beneficial to white people is good and their belief that anything which is detrimental to white people is bad, and their belief that white people should avoid business dealings with Jews and refuse to "employ niggers or other coloreds". Klassen's Little White Book declares that Creativity is the "one and only, true and revolutionary White racial religion", repudiating other racist religions such as Christian Identity and Wotanism.

Klassen was a racist who hated all black people and was very open about his contempt for blacks. In public discourse as well as in his writings, Klassen consistently referred to black people with the racial slur "nigger" and required that all followers of his religion use that word to refer to blacks rather than non-derogatory terms such as "black" or "African American". Klassen also condemned other racists who used slightly less derogative, but still quite offensive slurs such as "negro" declaring in print that "Furthermore, in looking up the word in Webster's dictionary I found the term 'nigger' very descriptive: 'a vulgar, offensive term of hostility and contempt for the black man'. I can't think of anything that defines better and more accurately what our position... should be...  If we are going to be for racial integrity and racial purity... we must take a hostile position toward the nigger. We must give him nothing but contempt."

The religion advocates the belief that American culture is becoming "more decadent", citing an increase in the number of "black crimes, the growing acceptance of homosexuality, interracial marriage, increasing drug use, and the lack of racial identity among white people" as evidence of its increasing decadence. According to the Anti-Defamation League, members believe that Jewish people are working towards the enslavement of all races, and in particular, they believe that the Jews are working towards the "mongrelization of the white race". During the early 2000s, the group was encouraged to move to Central Illinois in order to establish a "Creativity bastion" (i.e., a place where Creators are the majority demographic).

Creativity promotes "Salubrious Living", a religious health code which includes a fruitarian diet, but adherence to fruitarianism is not considered an absolute requirement for membership in Creativity. Klassen himself did not follow all the rules in his health code as historian George Michael noted in a book he wrote about Klassen and his group titled Theology of Hate: A History of the World Church of the Creator. In Theology of Hate, Michael observed that "despite his advocacy of healthy nutrition, some of his associates claimed that in practice Klassen did not actually follow the 'salubrious living' regimen, because he often ate red meat and ice cream."

The afterlife and the supernatural
Creativity rejects supernaturalism, affirming a metaphysical naturalist worldview. According to its founder Ben Klassen, a member is "not superstitious and disdains belief in the supernatural... [not giving] credence to, or playing silly games with imaginary spooks, spirits, gods and demons." Members do not believe that Nature is a conscious entity, but hold to a naturalistic pantheist view of "everything [is] in Nature"—"the whole cosmos, the total universe, including its millions of natural laws through space and time".

Members reject the concept of an afterlife believing that individual genetic "immortality" is attained through reproduction and legacy, with a cessation of consciousness of the individual at death. Creativity upholds collectivism over individualism and teaches that life and death on Earth should be viewed in a "rational, fearless manner". Members believe that the purpose of life is "the survival, expansion and advancement" of the white race with "continuance of the individual" attained through heredity and the legacy left to future generations.

Whereas Klassen was classified as an atheist, and Creativity has been labelled atheistic by the press, he objected to the usage of the term considering it a derogatory smear word without meaning employed by believers in what he termed "non-existent spooks in the sky" while stating that the "organized atheist movements" lacked any "positive creed and program of its own to replace the superstitions it seeks to destroy" while stating that most of the atheist movements in existence at the time did not take any pro-white racial stance and that many of them were under "heavy Jewish influence". Citing commonality, Klassen stated that both "atheism and Creativity deplore and denounce any and all supernatural beliefs, claims and superstitions. We do not believe in gods, devils, spooks, spirits, heaven or hell. We denounce all such hocus-pocus as being invented by men, largely for the purpose of controlling their minds and worldly affairs and extracting the utmost financial gain from them."

Racial socialism
The Southern Poverty Law Center classifies Creativity as a neo-Nazi ideology. According to Klassen, Creativity was not a rehash of Nazism, listing eight differences between the political ideologies as evidence of this. He adopted the phrase "racial socialism" to describe his political ideology. Klassen was critical of democracy and advocated meritocracy, believing that effective leaders should rule. Under racial socialism, "whites would work together toward common goals but without the massive economic planning in the style of the Soviet Gosplan". He supported a limited market economy, believing that social and economic activities should be in the best interests of white people. Klassen criticized "leftist proclivities" to recruit from the white working class: "All [white] members of the national or racial community ... had an important role to play."

Klassen urged members of Creativity to "work feverishly and aggressively to organize politically, to distribute literature on behalf of the White Race, to promote and foster White solidarity, and to get control of the government and the political machinery of the state by legal means if possible. If this is not possible by legal means, then we must resort to the same means as our forefathers used two hundred years ago to defend their liberty, their property, their homes and their families."

Activism
Creativity engages in proselytism with the stated goal of placing 10 million copies of two books, Nature's Eternal Religion and The White Man's Bible, into the hands of white people as part of its belief in "gird[ing] up for total war". It teaches the white genocide conspiracy theory in support of its perception that shifting population demographics is leading to miscegenation.

According to the Ontario Consultants on Religious Tolerance, the Creativity Movement opposes illegal activity and violence, believing it to be counterproductive. The group's member handbook threatens expulsion from the group for members who commit crimes or encourage others to do so. Despite this, the group has been connected to multiple religiously- and racially-motivated violent crimes. Members of the group view "racial holy war" (Rahowa) as a religious war of racial self-defense. The White Man's Bible states the belief that a Zionist Occupational Government will prevent Creativity from being promoted legally, and tells its readers that "when that stage
arrives (and we can well expect that our Jewish tyrants will push us to the limit), then we must again plan our actions accordingly—and deliberately, carefully and ruthlessly", calling for readers to, "use any means, legal or otherwise, available to us for our own survival," leading to the hunting down and eliminating of the group's "tormentors".

Practices

Holidays
The religion has several holidays. Creators are encouraged to observe them, spending time with their families and friends of the religion:
 South Victory Day (January 26): Commemorates the arrival of the First Fleet to the Australian continent in 1788.
 Klassen Day (February 20): Anniversary of its founder's birth in 1918.
 Founding Day (February 21): Anniversary of the publication of Nature’s Eternal Religion in 1973.
 Foundation Day, Rahowa Day (March 20): Anniversary of the foundation of the World Center in 1982 and a reminder of racial war.
 Kozel Day, Martyr's Day (September 15): Commemorates Brian Kozel, who died on this date in 1990.
 Festum Album (December 26 – January 1): Week-long celebration of white racial pride, commemorating the massacre at Wounded Knee. December 29, the anniversary of the massacre is also celebrated as "West Victory Day".

Ceremonies

Creativity has four life cycle ceremonies: The Creator Wedding Ceremony, the Creator Child Pledging Ceremony, the Ceremony of Confirmation of Loyalty to the White Race, and The Saying of Goodbyes to our Departed Brethren. Ceremonies are performed by church ministers. At a wedding, the bride and groom exchange vows before "Nature" and the congregation. The pledging ceremony is ideally conducted within two weeks after a child's birth, with both parents pledging to raise their child as a "loyal member of the White Race and faithful to the church." The confirmation ceremony is to ideally performed on the child's 13th birthday. The eulogy ceremony is up to the kin of the deceased with cremation an accepted method of disposition of the body.

Ministers

Klassen strove for every member to engage in recruitment and as such, granted "Ministerial Certificates" to "any legitimate White Man or Woman over the age of 16" who convinced church leadership that they were "dedicated to the noble cause of the White Race". Prospective ministers must demonstrate worthiness and pass written and oral examinations. The written exams consist of 150 questions (requiring a one-paragraph response to each) and an essay. Applicants are encouraged to request recommendations from three established ministers, and the final requirement is the signing of an oath.

Books

The two main texts behind Creativity are Nature's Eternal Religion and The White Man's Bible, written by Klassen in 1973. The books teach that the white race is the "pinnacle of Nature's creation", "nature's finest" and outlined a foundation for a "white racial religion". Section one of the first book critiques Christianity, black people as a "plague" and Jewish people as "parasitical masters of deceit". Many biblical stories, including those of Adam and Eve, Jonah and the whale and the resurrection of Jesus, are critiqued extensively in successive books penned by Klassen. The historicity of Jesus is denied, with Klassen affirming his belief in the Christ myth theory, a fringe ideology which claims that Jesus, the founder and central figure of Christianity was not a historical figure but was instead a fictional character. According to Creativity, Christianity is a violent religion which has killed 1,000 fellow Christians for every Christian killed by the Romans.

Adherents reject Christian teachings such as the Sermon on the Mount and Christian pacifism as leading to "racial suicide" and Christianity as having been formulated by Jews to destroy the Roman Empire with Islam being a "militant religion" having been formed as a Jewish plot to "mobilize the mud races" to invade and conquer Europe. They reject the exhortation in the Bible's Matthew 5:44 to "love one's enemies", believing that enemies should be hated, if not destroyed. In section two of the first text, Klassen went about laying the foundation for a "racial religion" to "replace Christ-Insanity" (as he referred to Christianity). In it, members are to reject the Golden Rule, saying that it does not make "good sense" and at a "closer look" it is a "completely unworkable principle" replacing it with its own "Golden Rule": What is good for the white race is the highest virtue and what is bad for the white race is the ultimate sin; racial loyalty is the greatest of all honors and racial treason is the worst of all crimes.

Klassen published an additional 11 books including Expanding Creativity, Building a Whiter and Brighter World and Rahowa! This Planet Is All Ours.

Figures

Gaede family
April Harrington (Gaede), mother of Lynx and Lamb Lingelser (Gaede) of the band Prussian Blue, was a longtime supporter of Creativity and a member of the World Church of the Creator, naming her third daughter Dresden Hale after its leader Matthew F. Hale before joining the National Alliance and then the splinter National Vanguard. Prussian Blue's song "Stand Up", written for David Lane (author of the Fourteen Words), was part of the unreleased Free Matt Hale CD intended to support the incarcerated Hale. Lamb and Lynx Gaede have denounced the movement, saying that they never chose it and were controlled by their mother.

Craig Cobb

Craig Cobb, who operated the video-sharing website Podblanc, has attempted to take over small towns in the Midwestern United States. He tried to establish an enclave in North Dakota and rename it "Trump Creativity" or "Creativity Trump" for Donald Trump. A church building purchased by Cobb to establish an enclave was "burned to the ground" in Nome, North Dakota.

George Burdi

George Burdi, also known as George Eric Hawthorne, was lead singer of the Canadian metal band RaHoWa, leader of the Toronto branch of the Church of the Creator, and founder of Resistance Records. He was convicted of assault, and claimed he renounced racism after serving time in prison. Burdi has been credited with a role in Creativity's survival after the death of Ben Klassen. 

In 2017, Burdi, in an interview with German neo-Nazi YouTube channel FSN.tv, admitted that he lied about his renunciation, that he felt he had never truly abandoned neo-Nazism and that he is still a racist. Burdi stated that he did indeed leave the neo-Nazi scene, which he considered a hiatus. Burdi also claimed that the media took his statements during his inactivity as a neo-Nazi out of context. During the interview, Burdi said that during his false renunciation, he kept contacts with over up to 100 individuals active in right-wing extremist movements, also noting that most of them live in Europe. Burdi also said his disillusionment with the skinhead scene was actually genuine.

However, for Burdi, a return to the neo-Nazi and racist scene did not mean a return to the Creativity religion. Burdi tells the interviewer that he has now converted to Hinduism, specifically the version of Hinduism combined with Nazism as propagated by Savitri Devi (a Greek-born French neo-Nazi Hindu mystic who claimed that Nazi leader Adolf Hitler was an avatar of the Hindu God Vishnu) and noted that his embrace of Devi's beliefs has helped him connect with his Hindu wife.

Matthew F. Hale

Several years after Klassen's 1993 death, white supremacist Matthew Hale founded the New Church of the Creator (later the World Church of the Creator). Hale made national news when he was denied admission to the Illinois State Bar on three occasions due to his racist beliefs. On November 12, 1999, the Illinois Supreme Court refused to further consider the denial of Hale's law license, continuing "a decision by its Committee on Character and Fitness that said Hale lacked the moral character to practice law." According to Hale, the committee's denial of his law license may have provoked Benjamin Nathaniel Smith's drive-by shooting spree.

On January 9, 2003, Hale was arrested and charged with attempting to direct security chief Anthony Evola to murder judge Joan Lefkow. Hale was found guilty of four of five counts (one count of solicitation of murder and three counts of obstruction of justice) on April 26, 2004; in April 2005, he was sentenced to 40 years in a Federal penitentiary.

Johannes Grobbelaar and Jurgen White
Johannes Grobbelaar and Jurgen White, Afrikaner Creators and members of the National Socialist Partisans (the paramilitary branch of the Blanke Bevrydingsbeweging), were killed in a November 1991 gun battle with South African police near Upington while attempting to smuggle weapons and explosives into a survivalist compound in Namibia. They were stopped by police, who were suspicious that their vehicle had been stolen. According to the report, while being escorted to a nearby police station they detonated a smoke bomb and attempted to escape. Police discovered their abandoned vehicle five miles away; Grobbelaar and White ambushed them. Two officers were shot, one fatally.

Ron McVan
Ron McVan, co-founder of the Wotansvolk racialist pagan group, was once affiliated with the Church of the Creator for two years as its second-in-command; McVan contributed articles and artwork to its periodical, Racial Loyalty, and was a martial-arts instructor for the church. Although Klassen and McVan shared anti-Christian beliefs, McVan sought a more spiritual approach and felt that Creativity needed spirituality. He moved to the Pacific Northwest and founded Wotan's Kindred in Portland, Oregon in 1992, saying that the group was rooted in the "genetic character and collective identity" of the white race.

David Lane, McVan's associate and co-founder of Wotansvolk, drew inspiration from Creativity, particularly ideas of a "racial religion", but did not agree with Creativity's "atheistic" stance and considered himself deist.

William Christopher Gibbs
William Christopher Gibbs, a Church of Creativity adherent in Georgia and a member of the Creativity Alliance, was arrested for possession of the biological toxin ricin. Gibbs went to a hospital after he accidentally got the ricin on his hands while experimenting with it.

On September 21, 2018, a Federal judge ordered Gibbs' release from Federal custody because of a technicality: ricin had been inexplicably dropped from the list of illegal biological toxins which are known as "select agents" due to changes in the 2004 law and edits to regulations in 2005. The judge did not rule out the possibility that Gibbs could be potentially convicted under another Federal law.  Gibbs continued to be incarcerated in the Fannin County, Georgia jail under a misdemeanor charge of reckless conduct which stemmed from his 2017 arrest and a probation violation connected to a 2010 conviction for burglary.

Legal problems and reorganization
In 1992, faced with financial and legal problems (including a civil lawsuit filed by the Southern Poverty Law Center) and the death of his wife, the aging Klassen looked for a successor. Although Rudolph G. ("Butch") Stanko was favored for the position, he was imprisoned at the time. Klassen selected Charles Edward Altvater, but replaced him before he could assume leadership (possibly due to recurrent criminal charges);   then chose Milwaukee neo-Nazi Mark Wilson, who ran the church from July 1992 to January 1993. Klassen abruptly replaced Wilson with Richard McCarty, working to establish McCarty in the Creativity community, before selling most of the church's property to the National Alliance's William Luther Pierce for $100,000. Pierce quickly sold the property to an unaffiliated third party for $185,000.

Shortly before and during McCarty's leadership, Creativity was plagued with legal problems; members were arrested for conspiracy, unlawful firearms possession and their association with the July 1993 firebombing of an NAACP building in Tacoma, Washington. McCarty struggled to keep the group unified. The lawsuit filed by the Southern Poverty Law Center (SPLC), seeking damages related to the May 1991 murder of Harold Mansfield, Jr. by Creator George Loeb, finally led to a March 1994 court ruling which fined the Church of the Creator $1,000,000. The court also ruled that Klassen's property sale to Pierce shortly before his suicide was collusion to deny payment to Mansfield's family, ordering Pierce to return his $85,000 profit from the resale of the property. With the church unable to pay the outstanding balance, the SPLC sued for its dissolution to settle the remaining damages and McCarty readily agreed.

Creativity Movement

Matthew F. Hale founded the New Church of the Creator in 1996, later renamed the World Church of the Creator. Hale's World Church of the Creator was a new and separate group rather than a direct successor to Ben Klassen's Church of the Creator. Until his arrest in 2003, Hale was the only Pontifex Maximus of the now-defunct World Church of the Creator. The current group known as The Creativity Movement is a white power skinhead-oriented direct successor to Hale's World Church of the Creator.

Headquartered in Zion, Illinois, with a heavy concentration of Creators in Montana, and 24 regional branches, it also claims to have local branches and members "all over the world".

In 2000 the Oregon-based TE-TA-MA Truth Foundation filed a lawsuit against the World Church of the Creator for using the name "Church of the Creator", since the Oregon group had trademarked and registered the name in 1982. U.S. District Court Judge Joan Lefkow ruled for the World Church of the Creator. In December 2002, the World Church of the Creator was fined $1,000 for each day it continued using the old name. Further appeals were denied by the U.S. Supreme Court in 2003. Hale was charged with contempt of court and soliciting the murder of judge Joan Lefkow, and sentenced to 40 years' imprisonment on April 6, 2005. Bill White was convicted of threatening a juror in the Matthew Hale case and sentenced to 42 months in prison.

In early 2017, a group referring to itself as the "Guardians of the Faith Committee" of the Creativity Movement elected James Costello of England as its "Pontifex Maximus".

Creativity Alliance

Australian man Cailen Cambeul, formerly known as Colin Campbell, was co-founder of Creativity Alliance in 2003.

In 2010 the Pontifex Maximus of Creativity Alliance was Joseph Esposito (Church of Creativity Oregon). The Creativity Alliance was for a short period known as the White Crusaders of the Rahowa (WCOTR), which was founded by former World Church of the Creator Members after Hale's arrest in 2003. Esposito and another  former Klassen supporter, George Loeb, are each serving extended prison sentences in Florida.

According to a Southern Poverty Law Center report, in 2015 the Creativity Alliance had groups in Georgia, Pennsylvania, South Carolina, Utah and Vermont. Creativity Alliance web pages and published books stress that they make no attempt to assume or supersede the registered trademark "Church of the Creator", owned by the TE-TA-MA Truth Foundation.

Randolph Dilloway, former Hasta Primus (Secretary, or second in command) of the Creativity Alliance and founder of the defunct Smoky Mountains Church of Creativity, was an accountant for the revived National Alliance (an unaffiliated neo-Nazi group formerly led by William Luther Pierce, author of The Turner Diaries) and assessed financial damage under past leadership. Claiming to fear for his life after discovering (and discussing) the errors, Dilloway contacted police and the SPLC and furnished documents alleging fraud and embezzlement by organization members.

In 2017 Creativity Alliance was found to be responsible for the distribution of flyers throughout Pittsburgh, Pennsylvania.
US members who have been arrested include a man from the Church of Creativity Georgia who was arrested for attempting to make ricin poison (the charge was later dropped), and Hardy Lloyd, a member from Pennsylvania, was arrested for violating his probation by distributing racist flyers, hoarding weapons, and participating in white supremacist web forums.

Australia
Cailen Cambeul, co-founded Creativity Alliance in 2003, three years after joining the World Church of the Creator, and served as "Pontifex Maximus" from 2009 until 2016. He was the fifth Pontifex Maximus (meaning "highest priest"), and the first resident outside the United States. His title is Church Administrator, referring to his chapter of the group as the Church of Creativity South Australia. Born in Adelaide, South Australia, Campbell self-describes as a "former outlaw biker and soldier in the Australian Army. He claims that he had a daughter who was "kidnapped" by the state, and sees the church as an outlet for his "natural aggression".

Creativity Alliance members are known to regularly distribute flyers; particularly in Australia and New Zealand.

The Attorney-General of South Australia and the Minister for Multicultural Affairs have made a number of attempts to close the website of the South Australian representative and Pontifex Maximus of the Creativity Alliance and outlaw the organization. Cambeul filed a complaint with the Australian Press Council that describing the Creativity Alliance as a white-supremacist organization (rather than a religion) and characterizing its members as "a few loners looking for something to do with all their hate" was unfair. His complaint was dismissed on the basis that the journalist's assessment was not a news article but an opinion piece.

UK
In 2015 CA distributed flyers in Inverbervie (Scotland) and Liverpool. A reverend speaking on behalf of the Church of Creativity Britain said in a letter to the editor that the leaflets were legal and called for racial separation, not supremacy.

Other legal cases
Creativity was recognized as a religion by the United States District Court for the Eastern District of Wisconsin in Peterson v. Wilmur Communications (205 F.Supp.2d 1014) (2002). The American Civil Liberties Union intervened on behalf of the World Church of the Creator.

California federal judge Maxine M. Chesney ruled against an imprisoned Creator who brought a suit against Pelican Bay State Prison based on an alleged violation of the Religious Land Use and Institutionalized Persons Act in Conner v. Tilton, 2009 U.S. Dist. LEXIS 111892 (ND CA, Dec. 2, 2009), in which Creativity and several other organizations and belief systems (including MOVE, veganism and the Church of Marijuana) were declared to not constitute "religions" but moral or secular philosophies under the definition of religion based on addressing of "fundamental and ultimate questions having to do with deep and imponderable matters"  as part of a three-point test for determining religion developed by the United States Court of Appeals for the Third Circuit. The court concluded that the plaintiff had failed to raise a genuine issue about whether Creativity is a religion; it found that to the extent Creativity deals with a "fundamental concern", the concern is with secular matters and not with what the court considered to be religious principles. Creativity is not "comprehensive" in nature because it was presented as confined to one question (or moral teaching), and that the structural characteristics of Creativity "do not serve to transform what are otherwise secular teachings and ideals into a religious ideology." In Hale v. Federal Bureau of Prisons (2015), the court found that Creativity may qualify as a religion under the First Amendment to the United States Constitution (with potential tax exemption by the IRS) and may be practiced in prison.

Furthermore, on March 12, 1989, U.S. federal judge Fern M. Smith of the United States District Court for the Northern District of California ordered San Quentin prison authorities to return "The White Man's Bible" to an inmate after it was confiscated and the state failed to prove that the book presented an imminent danger.

Leafletting campaigns
In March 2015, leaflets were posted on doors in southern Liverpool in the United Kingdom saying: "The white race is nature’s finest". Cailen Cambeul, Creativity minister and then Pontifex Maximus for the Creativity Alliance, said that he was responsible for their distribution. Complaints were made to the police by local councilors. Sarah Jennings of the local Green Party denounced Creativity as a "fringe group of blatant racists". According to Cambeul, "Any politician claiming disgust at our flyers and seeking to make political gains via our 100-percent-legal message is partaking in an opportunistic abuse of power at the expense of innocent people exercising their rights to speak out against the injustices of a politically correct world."

In the United States, northwest Montana and in particular the Flathead Valley has seen a "flurry of racist fliers" promoting the Creativity movement. The Southern Poverty Law Center listed Creativity Alliance presence in the state in 2015.

See also
 Nontheistic religion

References

External links
 Official website of the Creativity Alliance
 
 Nature's Eternal Religion by Ben Klassen, 1973. 
 Portfolio One – First 20 issues of the religion's flagship magazine Racial Loyalty.

 
1973 establishments in Florida
Alt-right
Anti-Christian sentiment in the United States
Antisemitism in the United States
Neo-Nazi concepts
Neo-Nazism in the United States
Nontheism
New religious movements
Organizations based in Illinois
Religion and race
Religious organizations established in 1973
Scientific racism
White separatism
Neo-Nazi organizations in the United States